The Fortress of Solitude is a fictional fortress appearing in American comic books published by DC Comics, commonly in association with Superman. It is the place where Superman first learned about his true identity, heritage, and purpose on Earth. The fortress functions as a place of solace/occasional headquarters for Superman and is typically depicted as being in frozen tundra, away from civilization. Its predecessor, Superman's "Secret Citadel", first appeared in Superman #17, where it was said to be built into a mountain on the outskirts of Metropolis. By issue #58 (May–June 1949) it is referred to as the Fortress of Solitude, seems at a glance to be a freestanding castle, and is said to be located in a "polar waste". When the Fortress reappears in 1958 and for the first time takes center stage in a story ("The Super-Key to Fort Superman", Action Comics #241), it is again an underground complex in a mountainous cliffside.

Traditionally, the Fortress of Solitude is located in the Arctic, though more recent versions of the Superman comics have placed the Fortress in other locations, including the Antarctic, the Andes, and the Amazon rainforest. The general public in Superman's world is either unaware or at best only vaguely aware of the existence of the Fortress, and its location is kept secret from all but Superman's closest friends and allies (such as Lois Lane and Batman). A trademark of the Fortress is that it contains a memorial statue of Jor-El and Lara, Superman's Kryptonian parents, holding a large globe of Krypton. Although Superman has living quarters at the Fortress, his main residence is still Clark Kent's apartment in Metropolis. The arctic Fortress of Solitude concept was first created for pulp hero Doc Savage during the 1930s.

Original version 

The concept and name "Fortress of Solitude" first appeared in the Doc Savage pulps in the 1930s and 1940s. Doc Savage built his Fortress of Solitude in the Arctic and retreated to it alone in order to make new scientific or medical breakthroughs, and to store dangerous technology and other secrets. The Golden Age Superman did not have an arctic fortress, but instead a "mountain sanctuary" which was located in a mountain range on the outskirts of Metropolis. Here, Superman kept a diary, oversized tools for various projects, and other equipment and trophies.

Superman's Silver Age Fortress, which debuted in 1958, was also located in the Arctic and served similar purposes. Built into the side of a steep cliff, the Fortress was accessible through a large gold-colored door with a giant keyhole, which required an enormous key to open it. The arrow-shaped key was so large that only Superman (or another Kryptonian such as Supergirl) could lift it; when not in use, the key sat on a perch outside of the Fortress, where it appeared to be an aircraft path marker. This was until a helicopter pilot followed the direction of the arrow straight to the entrance of the Fortress, forcing Superman to develop a cloak to camouflage the entrance and key (which now hung on brackets on its side beside the door) and to ensure the Fortress's secrecy.

The Fortress contained an alien zoo, a giant steel diary in which Superman wrote his memoirs (using either his invulnerable finger, twin hand touch pads that record thoughts instantly, or heat vision to engrave entries into its pages), a chess-playing robot, specialized exercise equipment, a laboratory where Superman worked on various projects such as developing defenses to kryptonite, a (room-sized) computer, communications equipment, and rooms dedicated to all of his friends, including one for Clark Kent to fool visitors. As the stories continued, it was revealed that the Fortress was where Superman's robot duplicates were stored. It also contained the Phantom Zone projector, various pieces of alien technology he had acquired on visits to other worlds, and, much like the Batcave, trophies of his past adventures. Indeed, the Batcave and Batman himself made an appearance in the first Fortress story. The Fortress also became the home of the bottle city of Kandor (until it was enlarged), and an apartment in the Fortress was set aside for Supergirl.

A detailed depiction of the Fortress and its contents forms the background to DC Special Series #26 (1981); "Superman and his Incredible Fortress of Solitude", in which Superman minutely inspects the Fortress, suspecting an enemy has planted an Earth-destroying bomb within it. Another noteworthy appearance of this version of the Fortress was in 1985's Superman Annual #11, a story by Alan Moore and Dave Gibbons titled "For the Man Who Has Everything", in which it served as a battleground for Superman, Batman, Robin, and Wonder Woman against the alien would-be overlord Mongul. This story was adapted to animation in the 2004 TV series Justice League Unlimited.

In addition to Mongul, the Fortress has been independently broken into at various times by villains Lex Luthor and Brainiac (Action Comics #583 and Superman #423) and the Atomic Skull (DC Comics Presents #35), among others. According to Action Comics #261, Superman first established secret Fortresses in outer space and at the center of the Earth before settling on an Arctic location.

Additionally, Superman established an undersea Fortress of Solitude – hollowed out of the side of an undersea cliff – in September 1958. The undersea Fortress, which is reportedly located at the bottom of the Sargasso Sea at 28 degrees North latitude, 50 degrees West longitude, is stocked with numerous exotic ocean relics and is equipped with sophisticated monitoring apparatus to enable Superman to keep abreast of events occurring throughout the seven seas. Superman later abandoned the undersea Fortress and the structure is now used by the mer-people of Atlantis as a showplace and a tourist attraction.

The original version of the Fortress of Solitude made its last appearance in the 1986 non-canonical (or "imaginary") story "Whatever Happened to the Man of Tomorrow?". In this story, under constant attacks by returning foes, Superman goes to ground inside the Fortress, taking his closest friends with him for their protection. The villainous android Brainiac soon besieges the Fortress with various allies, surrounding it and the outlying territory with an impenetrable force field to keep Superman's fellow heroes from aiding him. Superman ultimately battles a newly evil Mister Mxyzptlk, who was behind the plot to destroy him. As Superman was forced to destroy Mxyzptlk, breaking his vow against killing, he exposes himself to gold kryptonite to permanently remove his powers and then appears to leave the Fortress to freeze to death in the Arctic cold. Superman is never seen again, although we find out in a "ten years later" wraparound segment set in 1997 that he survives as Jordan Elliot, husband of Lois Lane Elliot, and that they are the parents of toddler Jonathan Elliot, who has super-powers.

Post-Crisis versions 

In John Byrne's 1986 Man of Steel miniseries, which re-wrote various aspects of the Superman mythos, the Clark Kent persona was described as a "Fortress of Solitude", in that it allowed him to live as the ordinary person he saw himself as and leave the world-famous superhero behind. This concept was often invoked in later stories, and one story featured Superman hiding his secret identity from a telepath behind a door identical to that of the pre-Crisis Fortress. By that time, however, a more physical Fortress had been reintroduced.

In Action Comics Annual #2 (1989), Superman, on a self-imposed exile to space, was entrusted with a Kryptonian artifact called the Eradicator, created by his ancestor Kem-El. Dedicated to preserving Krypton, this device built a new Fortress in the Antarctic as a precursor to recreating Krypton on Earth. Superman broke the Eradicator's control, but maintained the Fortress as a useful location for emergencies. The first appearance of this new post-Crisis version of the Fortress was in The Adventures of Superman #461 (December 1989).

It contained many artifacts from the post-Crisis version of Krypton, most notably a number of robot servitors (one of whom, Kelex, became a trusted confidant) and a battlesuit from the Third Age of Krypton.

This Fortress was cast into the Phantom Zone as a result of a battle between Superman, Lex Luthor, and Dominus, a villain who played with Superman's mind and who was also trapped in the Phantom Zone. It did, however, serve as the template for the next Fortress, built by Steel, which was an extradimensional space accessed through a vast puzzle-globe. The now-mobile Fortress was relocated somewhere in the Andes.

In the DC One Million series (1998), Superman's Fortress of Solitude in the 853rd Century resides within a tesseract located at the center of Earth's sun. By this time, Superman has lived in self-imposed exile within the Fortress for over 15,000 years.

During the "For Tomorrow" story arc in 2004–05 Superman comics, Wonder Woman breached the Fortress in an attempt to confront Superman, causing the Fortress to self-destruct. Superman subsequently established a new Fortress in an ancient temple on a remote village in the Cordillera del Cóndor Mountains, on the border of Ecuador and Peru. This version of the Fortress is visually similar to the earliest "Secret Citadel" from Superman #17.

The final version of the post-Crisis Fortress was home to Krypto and his dog-sitter Ned (the last remaining Superman robot), and contained a version of Kandor, a portal to the Phantom Zone, Kryptonian and alien artifacts, and holographic images of Jor-El and Lara. The caretaker of the Fortress was Kelex, a Kryptonian robot that was a descendant of the Kelex robot that served Jor-El.

Infinite Crisis 

In the 2006 limited series Infinite Crisis, several survivors of the pre-Crisis multiverse – the Earth-Two Superman, Lois Lane of Earth-Two, the Earth-Prime Superboy, and Earth-Three's Alexander Luthor, Jr. – set up a base in the ruins of the Antarctic Fortress following their escape from the "paradise dimension" they had been trapped in since the end of Crisis on Infinite Earths. It was then revealed from Power Girl's repressed memories from her life on Earth-Two that her cousin Kal-L had his own version of the Fortress of Solitude similar to his Earth-One counterpart's Fortress.

"One Year Later" 
In the 2006 story arc "Up, Up, and Away!", Superman recovered a piece of Kryptonian sunstone, which Lex Luthor had used to awaken an ancient Kryptonian warship. Superman learned that the sunstone had been sent with him from Krypton, and used it to construct a new Fortress in the Arctic in exactly the same manner as in the 1978 Superman film. He nevertheless plans to restore the Peruvian Fortress, even if compromised and no longer in a secret location, and plans more Fortresses around the world. This version of the Fortress physically resembles the movie and television depictions, and Superman communicates with Jor-El via crystal constructs as in the Superman film and Smallville.

The New 52 

In The New 52 reboot of DC's continuity (launched in 2011) the Fortress of Solitude is first seen floating in space. It is later revealed to be the orbiting ship of Braniac which Superman had taken over after he physically reprogrammed the Collector of Worlds. This fortress is reported destroyed in the five years between the current Action Comics arc, and the New 52 present day, with the current fortress once more in the Arctic. In the New 52, Supergirl also has her own fortress, known as Sanctuary, and located in the depths of the ocean. This fortress first appears in Supergirl (vol. 5) #12 with its purpose explained in Supergirl (vol. 5) #13. In Action Comics (vol. 2) #15, Superman is revealed to have a fortress which he refers to as his "Yucatan base", a reference to his fortress in the Amazon rain forest in previous continuity.

Following the discovery of Superman's "Super Flare", Kal-El made his way to the Fortress via a stolen motorcycle due to burning out his powers. When trying access the Fortress, the A.I. was unable to recognize Kal-El due to his DNA changing and forcibly removed his Kryptonian armor. It was revealed months later Vandal Savage was the person responsible for altering Superman's DNA in order to draw Kal-El away from the Fortress. Savage later converged all of his forces on the Fortress itself and transported it to Metropolis. However, Superman was able to find a temporary 'cure' for his power loss by exposing himself to kryptonite as a form of 'chemotherapy' that burned away the radiation preventing his cells from absorbing energy. On the verge of death while trying to stop Savage, he is caught by the arm and shot in the lower abdomen. As he fell from the sky believing he was about to die, the kryptonite had finished burning away the radiation. The Fortress scanned Superman, confirmed that he is Kal-El, activated and opened up, caught Superman, restored his powers to their peak and returned his Kryptonian armor to him. After defeating Vandal Savage and his children, Superman moves the Fortress back to the arctic circle.

Several days after the crisis Superman uses the Fortress's medical equipment and A.I technology to do a full physical on him and discovers that as a result of Vandal's actions using Krytonite to burn out his infected cells that he is dying and has mere weeks to live.

Following Superman's death, the Pre-New 52 Superman was able to gain access to the Fortress as both he and the deceased Superman share identical DNA, even though they are from separate timelines. Superman takes his deceased counterpart to the Fortress hoping to use the Regeneration Matrix to revive him, as the Eradicator did to him in his native timeline. In the New 52 universe of Prime Earth however, no such technology exists. After burying his counterpart in Smallville he returns to the Fortress and uses his heat vision to create a statue of Superman of Prime Earth to honor his fallen comrade.

The Eradicator of Pre-New 52 eventually arrives on Prime Earth and takes up residence within the Fortress.

Other versions

All-Star Superman 
In the out-of-continuity series All-Star Superman, the Fortress is once again located in the Arctic. Superman has replaced the giant key with a normal-sized key which is made from super-dense dwarf star material and weighs half a million tons, restricting its use to those with immense superhuman strength. It has a team of robots working on various projects. The Fortress itself contains the Titanic, the Space Shuttle Columbia, and a baby Sun-Eater, as well as larger-than-life memorabilia, similar to the objects found in the Batcave. It has various scientific facilities as well, including a time telescope that can receive brief cryptic messages with reception of limited quality from the future.

Earth One 
In Superman: Earth One graphic novel series, the Fortress of Solitude was built by Superman's Krytonian ship's AI, using the Arctic's cave system.

Other media

Television

Animation

Super Friends 
The Fortress has several appearances in the Super Friends animated series. The Super Friends version of the Fortress of Solitude is said to be located "in a deserted region of the frozen Arctic". In the episode "Terror at 20,000 Fathoms", Superman gives Aquaman, the Wonder Twins and Gleek a guided tour of the Fortress showing off many structures such as the Bottle City of Kandor. In a 1980 episode titled "Journey into Blackness", which said the Fortress was located "in a frozen and desolate area of the North Pole", Superman spots a black hole headed towards Earth using a telescope in the Fortress. In a 1980 episode titled "Revenge of Bizarro", Superman goes his Fortress of Solitude to stop Bizarro and return the Bizarro Super Friends back to normal with an Anti-Bizarro ray. A 1981 episode titled "Evil From Krypton" depicted the Fortress with a somewhat crystalline exterior and without the giant key, reminiscent of its film appearances. In a 1986 episode titled "The Death of Superman", the Fortress more closely resembles the pre-Crisis comic-book version, including a giant yellow key whose use required the combined efforts of Green Lantern, Wonder Woman and Cyborg.

DC animated universe 
Superman: The Animated Series and Justice League Unlimited present a slightly altered version, with the Fortress located in the ocean underneath the Arctic tundra; access was gained by diving into the Arctic water and emerging in an opening inside the Fortress. This version contained an alien zoo housing alien life-forms saved from the Preserver's ship and some computer equipment, along with a Brainiac information sphere stolen from his hijacked spacecraft just before it was destroyed, which is used by Superman to access information about Krypton. The fortress also contains massive sculptures of Superman's biological parents, Jor-El and Lara, serving as monuments to Krypton.

The Fortress of Solitude is also a major setting for the Justice League Unlimited episode "For the Man Who Has Everything". A fight with the warlord Mongul took place there, after he delivered a parasite capable of hypnosis to Superman and was detected by Batman and Wonder Woman. In this version, the name "Fortress of Solitude" was given by Professor Emil Hamilton in a sarcastically humorous remark while he visited the Fortress in one episode.

In the future of Batman Beyond, a Starro from the Fortress' intergalactic zoo is revealed to have latched on to Superman years prior and subtly controlled his actions since then, including allowing an entire population of the creatures to breed in one of the aquatic chambers. The Justice League of the future travels to the Fortress where they are themselves taken over by Starros, until Batman is able to free Superman and the rest of the League from their control. The League then sends the Starro population through a boom tube back to the world where the original Starro came from.

Legion of Super Heroes 
The Fortress also appears in the Legion of Super Heroes episode "Message in a Bottle". In that episode, the Legion chase Imperiex to the Fortress, where he shrinks himself to enter Kandor, to steal highly advanced ancient Kryptonian technology invented by Jor-El.

Young Justice 
In the episode "Failsafe", the Fortress of Solitude appears on Robin's satellite imagery as a location that was being investigated by alien invaders, although this was merely a dream-like state for a training exercise gone horribly wrong. Eight years later, the Fortress makes the first appearance in the penultimate episode of its fourth season, "Over and Out", when a boom tube leads a time-traveling Kyrptonian criminal and his criminal parents, Ursa and General Zod, from the Phantom Zone. The Kryptonian criminals are amazed upon seeing what the sole survivor of their home world has managed to collect over four decades on their history and culture. It is in this icy and frigid fortress, Zod and Ursa begin to gain even greater abilities from Earth's yellow sun by resting in stasis pods.

Justice League Action 
In Justice League Action episode "Field Trip", Superman gives Blue Beetle, Firestorm, and Stargirl a tour of the Fortress of Solitude.

Live-action

Adventures of Superman 
The 1950s Adventures of Superman TV series never mentions the Fortress of Solitude. The closest thing to it are cabins in remote mountains which Superman utilizes in the episodes "The Stolen Costume" (#13) and "Superman in Exile" (#33).

Lois & Clark: The New Adventures of Superman 
On Lois & Clark: The New Adventures of Superman, the "Fortress" was conspicuously absent, presumably because the series' aim was to explore the idea of Clark Kent being the true identity and Superman merely being the disguise (therefore, the character would have no use for an otherworldly fortress). In the earlier issues of the John Byrne revamp of Superman, the Fortress was also absent so the show was probably following suit.

In the tradition of this approach, the Fortress of Solitude was the name of Clark Kent's childhood treehouse in season one episode "The Foundling".

Smallville 
In Smallville, Jonathan Kent once referred to the loft space in the Kent farm's barn as the "Fortress of Solitude" since it was the place where the teenage Clark Kent usually preferred to be alone.

In season 4's finale "Commencement", After Clark had united all of the Stones of Power (Air, Water, Fire) they created a super crystal, the "Crystal of Knowledge". Once he grabbed the crystal it transported him to an opening in the Arctic Circle where he threw the crystal into the snow thus creating the Fortress of Solitude.

The fifth season premiere episode, Arrival, fully introduces a Fortress of Solitude that is almost identical, both in appearance and construction by self-replicating crystals, to that depicted in the original Superman movies. During the episode, Clark carries an injured Chloe Sullivan from the Fortress to a hospital in the Yukon, suggesting this is one of the nearest inhabited/medically proficient locations to the structure.

An artificial intelligence built into the Fortress by Clark's biological father, Jor-El, would provide Clark with various 'Trials' throughout the series to help steer him toward his destiny as a symbol of hope for humanity. The Jor-El A.I. was, for the most part, omniscient, with the ability to send characters through time, open portals to alternate dimensions, and remove, restore and also transfer Clark's powers to other characters, seemingly at will.

In later seasons, the Fortress is exposed as being vulnerable to other Kryptonian technology – namely Brainiac, and the Orb of Kandor. Lex Luthor would later use the Orb to revert the Fortress back into its original, handheld crystal form after becoming obsessed with Kryptonian conspiracy theories, and mistaking the structure for an alien invasion base. Lex also uses the orb to locate the fortress. The orb levitates and constructs a 3D globe of the world and isolates a circular section of Greenland.

When the crystal was later recovered by Lex's sister, Tess Mercer, as she searched for the now deceased Lex in Northern Greenland, Clark successfully rebuilt the Fortress to resume his training with Jor-El as well as to remove Brainiac from Chloe Sullivan. After completing this Jor-El told Kal-El that he was proud of him and will help in his fight with Doomsday. After Clark leaves Brainiac who has been hiding within the crystal console in his liquid form takes over the Fortress and changes the entire building black and produces the symbol for "Doom" on the floor. Chloe is then brought back to the Fortress after Doomsday crashed her and Jimmy's wedding where Brainiac downloads himself into Chloe leaving the Fortress itself and began to physically download all the knowledge into himself via Chloe. Brainiac then places Davis Bloom, Doomsday's human form in a Kryptonian chamber where it will take days to permanently transform him into Doomsday. After Brainiac was defeated by Clark and the Legion of Super Hero's Brainiac's connection to the Fortress was terminated and all the knowledge he stole returned as well as the Fortress turning back white. A few months after Jimmy was killed Clark was able to repair the Fortress and his connection to Jor-El to resume his Kryptonian training. Although fully repaired there were still a number crystallized pillars that were still black after Brainiac was defeated. However, it was discovered that the Fortress was repairing itself and by the following year, after Clark defeated Zod, all the black crystal pillars were destroyed with Fortress of Solitude fully repaired and purged of corruption ready to serve Clark in his quest to become Superman. During the series' tenth and final season, the Fortress became home to a Martha Kent-crafted, classic Superman costume, which Clark would go on to don in the final episode. Rather than being specifically made for the production, the costume was originally designed and created for Brandon Routh to wear in Superman Returns.

The Fortress is also referred to as Jor-El's 'Fortress of Knowledge' by his assistant Raya.

Arrowverse

Supergirl 
The Fortress appears in the Supergirl episode "Solitude". It contains Kal-El's spaceship, his parents' statue, a Legion Flight Ring and at least one robotic servant called Kelex. Superman had invited Kara there a number of times, but she always refused, afraid of being overcome by nostalgia. It is also mentioned by Kara's sister Alex Danvers that Kara's cousin uses the fortress as a base where he can communicate with his Kryptonian ancestors. Kara finally goes there with James Olsen to look for information about Indigo. In "Myriad", Kara visits the fortress seeking out Kal-El's whereabouts and the purpose of program Myriad. When Kelex refuses to give information to her, the fortress triggered a hologram of her mother of which she explained to her about Myriad's programming. In "The Last Children of Krypton", Superman and J'onn J'onzz visit this place to find information about Metallo. In the episode "The Darkest Place", Hank Henshaw/Cyborg Superman gains access to the Fortress and uses Kara's blood which Cadmus drained from her in order to access the Fortress's archive for information on Project Medusa. In "Medusa", Kara went to the Fortress to find information on Project Medusa and was told everything regarding the project by a hologram of her father. In "Mr. & Mrs. Mxyzptlk", Kara lures Mxyzptlk in fortress in order to trick him with a false self-destruct sequence and make him to type the abort code which happened to be his name backwards to force him to go back in his dimension. In "Distant Sun", Mon-El and Kara decide to talk to his mother Rhea in fortress about calling off the bounty on Supergirl's head. She refused and attacked Supergirl with kryptonite daggers, nearly killing her. Mon-El interrupted and decided to go with his mother to save Kara's life. In "Resist", during Daxamite invasion on Earth, Cadmus and DEO propose an alliance to stop invaders and save Lena Luthor and Mon-El from Rhea. Kara, Lilian Luthor and Hank Henshaw enter the Fortress to activate the Phantom Zone projector to board into Daxamite ship. After saving them, only Lena, her mother and Hank return to Fortress where Lilian betrayed Kara and Mon-El to leave them behind. However, Kara expected her betrayal and her friend Winn Schott Jr. put a bug device on Henshaw prior to rescue operation as a precaution. She activated the device to force him in reactivating the projector to beam Mon-El out of the spaceship, while staying behind to confront Rhea. In "Nevertheless, She Persisted" Kara and Kal-El are taken to Fortress by Alex to be healed after their brutal fight when Superman was poisoned with silver kryptonite by Rhea, hallucinating and thinking that he was fighting against General Zod. Kal-El then enters database to find a way to stop Daxamite war and finds it in the form of fighting ritual called Dakkar-Ur. The Fortress also appears in season four episodes where Nia Mal uses this place for her training. In the fifth season episode "Tremors", Kara and Lena go to the Fortress to find one of the Luthor's confiscated weapons to deal with alien being Rama-Khan, who comes to challenge Supergirl and Lena before he is defeated and escapes. Lena takes Myriad, revealing that she used Supergirl to get it and traps her in reprogrammed protocol defense while she escapes with transmatter portal in Lex's hideout Mount Norquay. In "Deus Lex Machina", Supergirl uses Myriad in Fortress to find the people who are stuck in virtual reality, but is incapacitated by Sun-Eater, which is released by Morae, an Leviathan operative who infiltrated under the orders from Lex Luthor. Morae is later captured by Supergirl and her friends. Lex later comes into the Fortress by using transmatter portal when finding its coordinates. It is later revealed in "The Missing Link" that he stole rings for Rama Khan in order to kill Supergirl.

Superman & Lois 
In the Superman & Lois episode "Pilot", Clark reveals that he brought Jonathan to check if Jonathan had superhuman abilities after showing some natural talent for sports. The Fortress's tests said it was unlikely however. In the episode "Heritage", Clark had brought Jordan to the Fortress after he manifested some abilities and wished to test for more information. However the A.I of Jor-El concluded that Jordan's powers were a result of brief flare ups and that his human DNA would limit him. Clark tells Lois that he is taking Jordan to the Fortress, when Jordan's powers flare uncontrollably. The A.I. tells Clark that Jordan will feel pain until he learns to control his super hearing. In the episode "Loyal Subjekts", Clark reveals, at some point, he was exposed to so much Kryptonite that he needed to go to the Fortress to be healed by having it burned from his system and since Jordan's lungs were freezing due to second-hand exposure to the synthetic kryptonite of Project 7734, Clark brought Jordan to the Fortress to be healed. There, Jor-El A.I. told Clark that it had to be burned from Jordan's system for him to heal. In the episode "O Mother, Where Art Thou?", Kal-El went to the Fortress to talk to the Jor-El A.I. about the revelation that Tal-Rho is his maternal half-brother. As the two talked, Jor-El revealed that reversing the Eradicator was beyond his knowledge. In the episode "A Brief Reminiscence In-Between Cataclysmic Events", flashbacks reveal that after the death of Jonathan Kent Sr., Clark came to the Fortress  learn about his abilities. Later, in the Fortress, Clark asked Lois to marry him. In present, Tal-Rho followed Clark to the fortress and put him in a trance where he kept reliving his memories. When Clark woke up, Tal destroyed Jor-El's hologram. In the episode "The Thing in the Mines", the Inverse World's Kal-El flew to the Fortress after fighting Superman, where he took off his armor after sustaining damage during the fight. In the episode "Anti-Hero", to protect his Inverse World counterpart from being killed by Mitch Anderson, Superman gave Anderson coordinates to the Fortress instead of Tal-Rho's fortress, where he actually was. Soldiers went to the Fortress and discovered the armor of Superman's counterpart, leading Anderson to conclude that they were working together. 

In episode 7 of season 2, it was revealed that this version of the Fortress of Solitude was located at 76.2 North and 100.4 West, which happens to be the Qausuittuq National Park in Canada, near the Arctic Ocean.

Krypton 
The Fortress of Solitude is central to the storyline of Krypton. In the first season, Seg-El, Kal-El's grandfather, visits the Fortress with his mother, Charys-El, to find the lost research of Val-El, Seg-El's grandfather, after Adam Strange requests Seg-El to find the Fortress to stop Brainiac from destroying Krypton and altering the timeline to prevent Kal-El's birth, 200 years later. Meanwhile, Nyssa-Vex and Jayna-Zod are trying to find the Fortress to prevent information about life on other planets from getting out to the public. The holographic Val appears to Seg and other allies in helping to expose and stop Brainiac's attempt to "bottle" Kandor City. Seg and Brainiac end up being trapped in the Phantom Zone projector in the Fortress, while the real Val-El is brought to Krypton by General Zod, who destroys the projector. In the second season, Seg and Nyssa come to emptied Fortress to remove Brainiac's nanites in Seg's brain stem. After removing them, Brainiac corrupts Val-El's image, brings the ship and teleports with Seg's and Nyssa's son, Jor-El, leaving from the Krypton somewhere in space.

Film

Original film series (1978-2006)
In Superman and its sequels (except for Superman III, in which it did not appear), the Fortress is created by a crystal that Jor-El enclosed in Kal-El's spaceship. The crystal leads teenage Clark Kent to an ice field where it is "planted" by Clark, after which it melts into the ice and grows into a huge crystalline building, similar to the crystalline architecture shown on Krypton at the beginning of the film. This fortress was also used to start Kal-El's 12-year training to become Superman. This Fortress contains numerous "memory crystals" that can be used to access Jor-El's artificial intelligence and hologram, interactive holographic recordings of Lara, and other Kryptonians, and a chamber that uses red sun radiation to strip Kryptonians of their super powers.

In Richard Donner's cut of Superman II, the Fortress is destroyed by Superman as its existence was revealed to Lex Luthor and his henchwoman, Eve Teschmacher. However, Superman then turns back time (à la 1978's Superman), so technically the Fortress is completely undamaged, while Zod, Ursa and Non are returned to the Phantom Zone.

In Superman Returns, the Fortress follows the same formula as the earlier movies, but goes into more detail about the crystal origins of the Fortress and Kryptonian architecture. Lex Luthor attempts to use memory crystals he stole from it to create a new land mass in place of America. An observation is made (following Superman II) that he acts as though he has been there before. The crystals that power the Fortress were lost when Lex Luthor's assistant dropped them out the escaping helicopter into the ocean below. The tie-in book, Superman Returns: The Visual Guide lists the Fortress as sitting on "Fletcher's Abyssal Plane".

DC Extended Universe
 The 2013 film Man of Steel depicts the Fortress of Solitude as a Kryptonian Scout Ship that crashed on Earth thousands of years ago (revealed in the Man of Steel comic to be because of a fight between Kara Zor-El and Dev-Em), with highly advanced alien technology. One of these aboard is a standard Genesis Chamber that can be used to repopulate Kryptonians for outposts and several smaller Kryptonian robots, one that almost killed Lois Lane but was saved by Kal-El / Clark Kent. While piloting the ship away from military stationed in Ellesmere Island, Clark accesses various holograms in the Fortress to learn about his Kryptonian origins. After Zod and his forces begin the attack on Earth, Zod accesses the ship with his own command key, then uses it to erase Jor-El's A.I and launches the ship towards Metropolis to populate a terraformed Earth and a reborn Krypton. Clark (now known as Superman) destroys the Scout Ship's control, and sends it crashing into Metropolis, destroying the sterile Genesis Chamber in the process.
 In the 2016 film Batman v Superman: Dawn of Justice, 18 months after what the world has called the "Black Zero Event", the U.S Government has built a facility around the wrecked ship and are attempting to gain access to it for research purposes. After Lex Luthor convinces Barrows, a U.S. Senator, that he can weaponize kryptonite to use as a "deterrent" against Superman, he grants him access to the ship and to the remains of General Zod for analysis. Lex, however, uses a shard of kryptonite to slice off Zod's fingerprints and then place them on his own hands for the ship to scan, which allows him to fully access the ship itself. The ship's A.I. then informs Lex that the craft was only operating at 37% efficiency and tells him about the Kryptonian database. The ship's control by General Zod is eventually overridden by Lex who then immerses Zod's body into the birthing chamber along with a drop of his own blood in order to create the monster Doomsday. After Superman fails to kill Batman, Lex unleashes Doomsday within the ship, but the monster is halted by Superman who throws him out of the ship itself to continue the fight. Lex is then arrested by Metropolis S.W.A.T team who have entered the ship after Batman contacted them, where they glimpse him conversing with Steppenwolf and is subsequently arrested. Following Superman's death, the ship is still present during Superman's memorial.
 Another non-traditional interpretation of the "Fortress of Solitude" concept is shown in Batman v Superman when Clark climbs a snowy mountain during his self-imposed exile and converses with a memory of his adoptive father Jonathan for guidance.
 In the 2017 film Justice League the Scout Ship again plays an important role in Superman's resurrection as Silas Stone and S.T.A.R. Labs have been brought in to study the ship. After finding out that the third and last Mother Box is with Cyborg, Bruce Wayne proposes that the advanced alien technology inside it can be used to bring back Superman if that power can be channeled through Superman's body. After initial protest from Wonder Woman, the team decides to go ahead with the plan. After Cyborg and the Flash dug up the corpse of Clark and help it transport inside the secure facility, it is revealed that during the events of Batman v Superman: Dawn of Justice, Lex Luthor burned the internal circuits of the ship while creating Doomsday, prompting Flash to voluntarily charge the Mother Box via static electricity. As Aquaman drops the Mother Box on the corpse dipped in the electrolyte solution of the ship, Flash charges the box by gaining charge with running. They are successful, as it helps in resurrecting Superman, although he has no memories of his past, and quickly turns hostile on the group. Left unguarded, Steppenwolf retrieves the last Mother Box lying outside the facility via transporting through a Boom Tube.
 The 2021 director's cut Zack Snyder's Justice League shows the League deciding to resurrect Superman with less pushback, though the ship's AI warns Cyborg not to proceed as it senses consequences such as the resurrected Superman falling under Darkseid's control. Clark returns to the ship after visiting his childhood home with Lois and regaining his memories, picking out a black-colored variant of his suit before joining the rest of the League to fight Steppenwolf in Russia. Afterwards, Ryan Choi is appointed by S.T.A.R. Labs to take over oversight of the ship after Silas sacrifices himself to help the League track down Steppenwolf.

Video games 
In the video game The Death and Return of Superman for SNES, the Fortress of Solitude is shown in one of the cutscenes.

The Fortress of Solitude is a location in Mortal Kombat vs. DC. Its appearance is based on the Donner-Singer films, but with some added visuals including ice statues of Jor El and Lara holding up Krypton, and a Jor El image behind a crystal. This same fortress design is shown in the DC Universe Online MMORPG, and is used by Batman and Lex Luthor as a last bastion against the forces of Brainiac. A similar design was used in Injustice: Gods Among Us.

The Fortress of Solitude is featured in the Lego Batman 3: Beyond Gotham.

References

External links 
 Super Who's Who: The Fortress of Solitude Featuring the original Citadel, the 1949 Fortress, and the 1958 version
 Supermanica: Fortress of Solitude Supermanica entry on the pre-Crisis Fortress of Solitude
 Google Sketchup/Earth Model of the Fortress of Solitude
 Supermanica: Secret Sanctuary Supermanica entry on the Secret Sanctuary
 Comic Coverage: The Fortress at 50
 Superman's Fortress of Solitude, a short story by Rick Stoeckel

Fictional elements introduced in 1958
Superman
Arctic in fiction
Fiction about alien zoos
Solitude
Fictional museums
Fictional secret bases
DC Comics locations
Fictional buildings and structures originating in comic books

sv:Stålmannen#Utrustning